An equivalent of presidential election was held in the Romanian People's Republic between 23 and 24 March 1965.

On 23 March 1965, the Romanian Workers' Party held its Central Committee session in Bucharest. The party leaders proposed the Great National Assembly (Romania's Communist parliament) the next General Secretary of the party should be Nicolae Ceaușescu and the next president of the State Council of Romania should be Chivu Stoica.

On 24 March 1965, the Great National Assembly voted in favor of Chivu Stoica, thus becoming the second president of the State Council of Romania, de facto Romanian head of state.

Candidate

References

President of the State Council election
Nicolae Ceaușescu